Lillingstone Dayrell is a village in Buckinghamshire, England. It is in Aylesbury Vale, about three and a half miles north of Buckingham, eight miles west of Milton Keynes and five miles south of Towcester. Lillingstone Dayrell with Luffield Abbey and the neighbouring hamlet of Lillingstone Lovell are separate civil parishes within Aylesbury Vale district.

The village name 'Lillingstone' is Anglo Saxon in origin, and means 'Lytel's boundary stone', referring to the proximity of both places to the border with Northamptonshire. In the Domesday Book of 1086, both settlements were recorded jointly as Lillingestan though already at that time there were two manors owned respectively by the Dayrell and Lovell families. The suffix 'Dayrell' (as 'Dayerell') was first recorded in the fourteenth century. The Dayrell family were Lords of the Manor from the fourteenth century until the 1880s.

Notable buildings
The parish church of Lillingstone Dayrell is dedicated to St Nicholas of Myra.

Lillingstone House is the ancient seat of the Dayrell family.

In 1882, the banker Abraham John Robarts, of Robarts, Lubbock & Co., then the tenant of Lillingstone House, built Tile House in the village for himself, designed by Ewan Christian. This is described by Nikolaus Pevsner as “Neo-Elizabethan, big and forbidding with groups of huge chimneys.”

Notable people
Gerald Robarts (1878–1961), banker, soldier, and notable squash player, lived at Lillingstone Dayrell House.

References

Further reading
Eleonora Dayrell, The History of the Dayrells of Lillingstone Dayrell (1885)

External links

The deserted medieval village and the surviving church
 North Buckingham Parish

Villages in Buckinghamshire
Former civil parishes in Buckinghamshire